Kaeng pa (lit. 'forest curry' or 'jungle curry') is a variety of Thai curry from the forested areas of Thailand. Unlike many other Thai curries, traditional kaeng pa usually contains no coconut milk, as coconuts are not naturally found in the rainforests in the northern part of the country. This quality makes it more suitable for people on low saturated fat diets. There are, however, variants that do include coconut.

Kaeng pa is a highly spicy and watery curry that has a distinctive full taste. Ingredients usually include kaffir lime peel and leaves, lemongrass, green pepper corns, galangal, garlic, pea eggplant and chilli. It was originally prepared with wild boar, but is now more commonly prepared with pork or chicken.

See also
 Thai curry

References

Thai soups
Thai curries
Spicy foods